Festuca dimorpha is a species of plant in the family Poaceae. This species is native to France and Italy. Festuca dimorpha was first described in 1826.

Habitat 
It is perennial and grows in temperate biomes.

References

dimorpha